Excellence: The Magazine About Porsche (known simply as Excellence and originally named Porsche Magazine) Is a magazine published by Ross Periodicals for owners and fans of Porsche cars. The magazine was started in 1986. It is published eight times a year in California.

References

External links
 Excellence magazine's own web site

Automobile magazines published in the United States
Magazines established in 1986
Magazines published in California
Eight times annually magazines published in the United States